The Arun Jaitley Stadium is a cricket stadium owned and operated the Delhi & District Cricket Association (DDCA) and located on Bahadur Shah Zafar Marg, New Delhi. It was established in 1883 as the Feroz Shah Kotla Stadium, and named after the nearby Kotla fort. It is the second oldest functional international cricket stadium in India, after the Eden Gardens of Kolkata. As of 25 October 2019, it has hosted 34 Tests, 25 ODIs and 6 T20I.

In a 2017 felicitation ceremony, the DDCA named four stands of the stadium after former India captain Bishan Singh Bedi, former India all-rounder Mohinder Amarnath, former India and Delhi opener Gautam Gambhir. The home team's dressing room was named after Raman Lamba and the away dressing room after Prakash Bhandari.

On 12 September 2019, the stadium was renamed in memory of former DDCA President and Finance Minister Arun Jaitley, after his death on 24 August 2019. DDCA president Rajat Sharma said: "It was Arun Jaitley's support and encouragement that players like Virat Kohli, Virender Sehwag, Gautam Gambhir, Ashish Nehra, Rishabh Pant and many others could make India proud." Arun Jaitley has also been credited with turning the stadium into a modern facility, increasing its seating capacity and building better facilities for players during his tenure as DDCA president. The stadium was officially renamed at a function that took place on 12 September 2019. One of the stands of the stadium was named after former Indian captain Virat Kohli on the same date. The name change has been criticised by former Indian captain Bishan Singh Bedi. After announcing the name change, DDCA clarified that only the stadium had been renamed and that the ground would be still called the Feroz Shah Kotla Ground.

As of 2017, the India national cricket team had been undefeated for over 28 years in Test matches and for over 10 years in ODI matches at this ground.

History
The first Test match at this venue was played on 10 November 1948 when India took on the West Indies.

Records 
In 1952, playing against Pakistan, Hemu Adhikari and Ghulam Ahmed were involved in a record tenth wicket stand of 111 runs – a record that still stands. In 1965, S Venkataraghavan, in his debut series, demolished the New Zealand line up with figures of 8 for 72 and 4 for 80. In 1969–70, Bishen Singh Bedi and Erapalli Prasanna combined to spin India to a famous seven wicket win over Australia, the duo picking 18 wickets between themselves.
In 1981, Geoff Boycott surpassed Gary Sobers' world record test aggregate.

In 1983, Sunil Gavaskar hit his 29th test ton in this ground to equal Don Bradman's then record tally of 29 centuries.

In 1999, Anil Kumble took all 10 wickets in an innings against Pakistan, to become only the second bowler to achieve this feat after Jim Laker.

In December 2005, Sachin Tendulkar scored his 35th test century against Sri Lanka to break Sunil Gavaskar record of the most test centuries.

2009 Dangerous pitch 

On 27 December 2009, an ODI match between India and Sri Lanka was called off because pitch conditions were classed as unfit to host a match. Based on match referee's report of the match, the ground was banned by the International Cricket Council (ICC) for 12 months. International cricket returned as stadium at the 2011 Cricket World Cup.

Indian Premier League
Since 2008 the stadium has been the home of the Delhi Capitals (formerly Delhi Daredevils) of the Indian Premier League.

2017 Smog incident

During the second day of third test of Sri Lankan cricket team in India in 2017-18 at Delhi, smog forced Sri Lanka cricketers to stop play and wear anti-pollution masks, a rare sight in terms of play interruptions. Cricketer Lahiru Gamage reported to have shortness of breath. Nic Pothas, coach of Sri Lankan cricket team, reported that cricketer Suranga Lakmal had vomited regularly due to severe pollution effect on the Delhi ground. There was a haltage of play between 12:32pm to 12:49pm, which caused Indian coach Ravi Shastri to come out to consult with the on-field umpires. BCCI president C. K. Khanna accused the Sri Lankan team of making fuss while Indian spectators called the team "melodramatic". On day 4, India's Mohammed Shami was also seen vomiting on the field.

Following the match, both participating countries criticised the choice to play the Test in Delhi with the high levels of pollution. The Sri Lanka manager Asanka Gurusinha said that both teams were using oxygen cylinders in their dressing rooms due to breathing difficulties, and suggested the use of air-quality meters in future fixtures. President of the Indian Medical Association, KK Agarwal, said that playing in such conditions could result in lung and heart disease, and recommended the inclusion of atmospheric pollution as a factor in the assessment criteria for a match.

Statistics

Indian cricket team have won 10 test matches here until date out of 18 test matches.(Matches which have loss or win)

 Most successful team overall:- India - 10 wins
 Most successful visiting team:- England – 3 wins
 Highest Innings Score : 644/8 by West Indies on 6 February 1959
 Lowest Innings Score : 75 all out by India on 25 November 1987
 Wins Batting First : 5
 Wins Bowling First : 13
 Average Innings Score :285
 Most Runs : Sachin Tendulkar (759 runs)
 Highest Individual Score : 243 by Virat Kohli v Sri Lanka  on 3 December 2017
 Most Successful Bowler : Anil Kumble (58 wickets)

Various format records

Test record 
The highest test score on this ground is by the West Indies, when they scored 644–8 in 1959 and 631 all out in 1948. The next highest score was made by India scoring 613–7 in 2008. The most runs scored here is by Dilip Vengsarkar (673 runs), followed by Sunil Gavaskar (668 runs) and Sachin Tendulkar (643 runs). The most wickets taken here is by Anil Kumble (58 wickets), followed by Kapil Dev (32 wickets) and R Ashwin (27 wickets).

ODI record 
 Only two times has a team scored 300+ runs in an innings .
 The Highest ODI total on this ground is 330/8, scored by the West Indies against the Netherlands at the 2011 Cricket World Cup.
 8 batsmen have scored ODI centuries - Roy Dias (Sri Lanka), Sachin Tendulkar (India), Ricky Ponting (Australia), Nick Knight (England), AB de Villiers (South Africa), Virat Kohli (India), Kane Williamson (New Zealand), Usman Khawaja (Australia) 
 Viv Richards (West Indies) took 6 wicket against India in 1989.

ODI Cricket World Cup
This stadium has hosted One Day International (ODI) matches when India hosted the Cricket World Cup in 1987, 1996 and 2011.

Twenty20 internationals

2016 ICC World Twenty20
The ground was selected to host matches in the 2016 ICC World Twenty20. Three matches from Group A were scheduled to be played here as well as one semi-final. The first ever Twenty20 International held at the ground was a Group A match between England and Afghanistan.

Indian cricket team matches
The ground hosted a T20I match on 1 November 2017 between India and New Zealand, the first ever Indian International Twenty-20 at this ground and also the last international match for Ashish Nehra. On the eve of his farewell game, the DDCA renamed one end of the Feroz Shah Kotla Ground as "Ashish Nehra End" for one day, making Nehra the second bowler in cricket history, after James Anderson (cricketer), to have bowled from an end named after him.

The first match of the Bangladesh tour of India 2019–20, the T20I in Delhi, was the 1,000th men's Twenty20 International match was played on 3 November 2019. Bangladesh won the match by seven wickets, to record their first ever victory against India in the format.

Accessibility
Road: Bahadur Shah Zafar Marg.

Delhi Metro: Delhi Gate metro station.

Air: Indira Gandhi International Airport.

See also
List of Test cricket grounds
List of international cricket centuries at the AJS
List of international cricket five-wicket hauls at the AJS

References

 Arun Jaitley Stadium at Government of Delhi

External links

 Arun Jaitley Stadium Layout
 Article on the ground from The Hindu
 Stats on the ground from Cricinfo

Test cricket grounds in India
Sports venues in Delhi
Cricket grounds in Delhi
Buildings and structures in New Delhi
1987 Cricket World Cup stadiums
1996 Cricket World Cup stadiums
2011 Cricket World Cup stadiums
1883 establishments in India
Sports venues completed in 1883